Ophiodermella is a genus of sea snails, marine gastropod mollusks in the family Borsoniidae.

Species
Species within the genus Ophiodermella include:
 Ophiodermella akkeshiensis (Habe, 1958)
 Ophiodermella cancellata (Carpenter, 1864)
 Ophiodermella fancherae (Dall, 1903)
 Ophiodermella grippi (Dall, 1919)
 Ophiodermella inermis (Reeve, 1843)
 Ophiodermella miyatensis (Yokoyama, 1920)
 Ophiodermella ogurana (Yokoyama, 1922)
 Species brought into synonymy 
 † Ophiodermella bella Ozaki, 1958: synonym of Retimohnia bella (Ozaki, 1958) (original combination)
 Ophiodermella incisa (Carpenter, 1864): synonym of Ophiodermella inermis (Reeve, 1843)
 Ophiodermella montereyensis Bartsch, 1944: synonym of Ophiodermella inermis (Reeve, 1843)

References

 Shimek, R. L. "Biology of the northeastern Pacific Turridae. 1. Ophiodermella." Malacologia 23.2 (1983): 281-312.
 McLean J.H. (1996). The Prosobranchia. In: Taxonomic Atlas of the Benthic Fauna of the Santa Maria Basin and Western Santa Barbara Channel. The Mollusca Part 2 – The Gastropoda. Santa Barbara Museum of Natural History. volume 9: 1-160

External links
  Bartsch, P, Some turrid mollusks of Monterey Bay and vicinity; Proceedings of the Biological Society of Washington, v. 57 p. 57-68
  Bouchet P., Kantor Yu.I., Sysoev A. & Puillandre N. (2011) A new operational classification of the Conoidea. Journal of Molluscan Studies 77: 273-308.
 

 
Gastropod genera